Tokio Remix is the first remix album by Japanese band Tokio. It was released on March 8, 1995. The album reached ninth place on the Oricon weekly chart and charted for five weeks.

Track listing

References 

Tokio (band) albums
1995 remix albums
Sony Music remix albums